900 East is a light rail station in the Central City neighborhood of Salt Lake City, Utah, United States serviced by the Red Line of the Utah Transit Authority's (UTA) TRAX light rail system. The Red Line provides service from the University of Utah to the Daybreak community in South Jordan.

Description 
The station is located at 875 East 400 South (East University Boulevard/SR-186), with the island platform being in the median of 400 South. As part of the UTA's Art in Transit program, the station features a sculpture of stainless steel and recycled bicycle wheels created by Stuart Keeler and Michael Machnic entitled The Place Between. Unlike most TRAX stations, 900 East does not have a Park and Ride lot. The station is part of a railway right of way that was created specifically for the former University Line. The station was opened on 15 December 2001 as part of the former University Line and is operated by the Utah Transit Authority.

Notes

References 

TRAX (light rail) stations
Railway stations in the United States opened in 2001
Railway stations in Salt Lake City
2001 establishments in Utah